Moravany may refer to places:

Czech Republic
Moravany (Brno-Country District), a municipality and village in the South Moravian Region
Moravany (Hodonín District), a municipality and village in the South Moravian Region
Moravany (Pardubice District), a municipality and village in the Pardubice Region
Moravany, a village and part of Řehlovice in the Ústí nad Labem Region
Moravany, a village and part of Ronov nad Doubravou in the Pardubice Region

Slovakia
Moravany, Michalovce District, eastern Slovakia
Moravany nad Váhom, western Slovakia